Gastrocopta armifera, common name the armed snaggletooth, is a species of very small air-breathing land snail, a terrestrial pulmonate gastropod mollusk in the family Vertiginidae.

Distribution 
This species occurs in the United States east of the Rocky Mountains, and in Canada in Alberta (at Red Deer), and Manitoba (at Brandon).

References

Vertiginidae
Gastropods described in 1821